Odie is a fictional dog who appears in the comic strip Garfield by Jim Davis. He has also made appearances in the animated television series Garfield and Friends and The Garfield Show, two live-action/CGI feature films, and three fully CGI films.

Appearances 
Odie is a yellow-furred, brown-eared dog. In the live-action/animated films based on the Garfield franchise, he is depicted as a wire-haired dachshund/terrier mix.

He has a large tongue and slobbers in his appearances. After October 1997, he began walking regularly on two feet, instead of all fours, like Garfield. In the feature film adaptation Garfield: The Movie, Odie's ability to walk, and more importantly dance on two legs, earns him a lot of attention, and is a major plot point throughout the film. He is seen by Garfield as a “slobbering atrocity” in some of the earlier strips, and then later Garfield feels more sympathetic about Odie.

History
The name came from a car dealership commercial written by Jim Davis, which featured Odie the Village Idiot. Davis liked the name Odie and decided to use it again. When Garfield was first submitted, Davis called Odie "Spot". He then visited cartoonist Mort Walker to show him his strips, and Walker told Davis "I had a dog named Spot". When Davis asked "Really?", Walker replied "Yes, in Boner's Ark, one of my comic strips". Davis changed Spot's name to Odie.

Odie first appeared in the strip on August 8, 1978; the date is considered his birthday. He was originally a pet to Jon Arbuckle's friend and roommate, Lyman, but Lyman disappeared from the series after about five years with no explanation, after which ownership of Odie transferred to Jon instead. However there was a four part episode from The Garfield Show which explained what happened to Lyman and how they found him. 

Like Garfield, Odie used to be presented as a quadrupedal but now stands mostly bipedal.

References

External links
 Garfield and Friends official site

Fictional dogs
Garfield characters
Comics characters introduced in 1978
Fictional characters from Indiana
Fictional mute characters
Male characters in comics